Jane Worcester (died October 8, 1989) was a biostatistician and epidemiologist who became the second tenured female professor, after Martha May Eliot, and the first female chair of biostatistics in the Harvard School of Public Health.

Worcester graduated from Smith College in 1931, with a bachelor's degree in mathematics, and was hired by Harvard biostatistician Edwin B. Wilson to become a human computer at Harvard.
They continued to work together on theoretical research in biostatistics until Wilson retired as chair of the department in 1945, eventually publishing 27 papers together. Worcester completed a Ph.D. in epidemiology at Harvard under Wilson's supervision in 1947; her dissertation was The Epidemiology of Streptococcal and Non-Streptococcal Respiratory Disease.
She joined the Harvard faculty, was granted tenure in 1962,
and served as chair from 1973 to 1977, when she retired.

She became a Fellow of the American Statistical Association in 1960. In 1968, Smith College awarded her an honorary doctorate.

References

Year of birth missing
1989 deaths
American statisticians
Women statisticians
Smith College alumni
Harvard School of Public Health alumni
Harvard School of Public Health faculty